Thomas Kimberly Brace (October 16, 1779 – June 14, 1860) was an American insurance executive and politician.

He was son of Jonathan Brace, and was born in Glastenbury, Connecticut, October 16, 1779. He graduated from Yale University in 1801.  He was through life a prominent citizen of Hartford, Connecticut. For many years he was a merchant there, and 1819 he became the principle founder and developer of the Aetna(Fire) Insurance Company, established in Hartford. Brace served as the company's first President (and would remain on the Board of Directors until his death in 1860). In 1820 Brace authored the rewriting of the company Charter allowing Aetna to underwrite life insurance and annuities, earning Brace the title of "father" of American life insurance. He was a Representative of the town of Hartford in the Legislature of Connecticut, and was mayor of Hartford from 1840 to 1843.

He died in Hartford, June 14, 1860, aged 80.

References

Sources

1779 births
1860 deaths
Yale University alumni
Aetna employees
Members of the Connecticut House of Representatives
Mayors of Hartford, Connecticut
People from Glastonbury, Connecticut
Businesspeople from Connecticut